Grodziec Mały  is a village in the administrative district of Gmina Głogów, within Głogów County, Lower Silesian Voivodeship, in south-western Poland.

The village has an approximate population of 500.

References 

Villages in Głogów County